Johan Jacobs (born 1 March 1997) is a Swiss road and cyclo-cross cyclist, who currently rides for UCI WorldTeam . He competed in the men's under-23 event at the 2016 UCI Cyclo-cross World Championships.

Major results

Cyclo-cross

2013–2014
 1st  National Junior Championships
 2nd Overall Junior Superprestige
1st Middelkerke
2nd Hoogstraten
2014–2015
 1st  National Junior Championships
 Junior BPost Bank Trophy
1st Koppenbergcross
1st GP Sven Nys
1st Krawatencross
 2nd Overall UCI Junior World Cup
1st Namur
3rd Valkenburg
 2nd Overall Junior Superprestige
1st Middelkerke
2nd Zonhoven
2nd Ruddervoorde
2nd Hoogstraten
3rd Gieten
3rd Diegem
 3rd  UEC European Junior Championships
2015–2016
 3rd National Under-23 Championships
2016–2017
 1st  National Under-23 Championships
2017–2018
 2nd National Under-23 Championships
 National Trophy Series
3rd Ipswich

Road
2019
 1st Stage 2 (TTT) Tour de l'Avenir
 2nd Paris–Roubaix Espoirs
 7th Ronde van Vlaanderen Beloften
 8th Sundvolden GP
2020
 4th Road race, National Championships
2021
 3rd Road race, National Championships

Grand Tour general classification results timeline

References

External links
 

1997 births
Living people
Cyclo-cross cyclists
Swiss male cyclists
Cyclists from Zürich